The 2001–02 Connecticut Huskies women's basketball team represented the University of Connecticut in the 2001–2002 NCAA Division I basketball season. Coached by Geno Auriemma, the Huskies played their home games at the Hartford Civic Center in Hartford, Connecticut, and on campus at the Harry A. Gampel Pavilion in Storrs, Connecticut, and are a member of the Big East Conference.  At the Big East women's basketball tournament, the Huskies won the championship by defeating Boston College 96–54. The Huskies won their third NCAA championship by defeating the Oklahoma Sooners, 82–70. The starting five of Sue Bird, Swin Cash, Asjha Jones, Tamika Williams, and Diana Taurasi are generally considered the greatest starting lineup in Women's College Basketball history.

On December 29, 2011, the team was recognized as one of the greatest in the program's history by induction into the Huskies of Honor.

Roster changes
Five players from the 2000–01 team (Shea Ralph, Svetlana Abrosimova, Kelly Schumacher, Christine Rigby, and Marci Czel) were seniors and are no longer part of the team. One sophomore player, Kennitra Johnson, decided to leave UConn to be closer to her mother, and transferred to Purdue. Two freshmen joined the team: Ashley Valley, younger sister of Morgan Valley, and Stacey Marron. Although Marron had received scholarship offers from other schools, she chose to apply to UConn and attempt to make the team as a walk-on. She succeeded, and eventually earned a full scholarship, the first Connecticut walk-on to earn a basketball scholarship.

Two other players were not new to the program, but 2001-2002 was their first full season. Ashley Battle was a freshman in the prior year, but sustained an elbow injury in the fifth game of the season, and did not play the remainder of the season. Battle applied for a medical hardship, often called a redshirt. Jessica Moore also joined the team in the prior year, but elected not to play her first year.

Roster
Source

Schedule
Source

|-
!colspan=8| Regular season

|-
!colspan=9| 2002 Big East Women's Basketball Tournament

|-
!colspan=10| 2002 NCAA Division I women's basketball tournament

Team players drafted in the 2002 WNBA draft

Additionally, Diana Taurasi was also the first overall pick in the 2004 WNBA draft. In the 2005 WNBA draft, Jessica Moore was selected 24th overall, and Ashley Battle was selected 25th overall.

Awards and honors
 Sue Bird, Naismith Award
 Sue Bird, Wade Trophy
 Sue Bird, Nancy Lieberman Award
 Sue Bird, Lowe's Senior CLASS Award
 Sue Bird Sportswoman of the Year Award
 Sue Bird Big East Conference Women's Basketball Player of the Year
 Sue Bird Honda Sports Award, basketball
 Swin Cash, Tournament Most Outstanding Player
 Asjha Jones, Most Outstanding Player, Big East women's basketball tournament
 Geno Auriemma Naismith College Coach of the Year
 Geno Auriemma WBCA National Coach of the Year

See also
UConn–Rutgers rivalry
UConn–Tennessee rivalry

References

Connecticut
UConn Huskies women's basketball seasons
NCAA Division I women's basketball tournament championship seasons
NCAA Division I women's basketball tournament Final Four seasons
Connect
Connect
2002 NCAA Division I women's basketball tournament participants